"Let's Make Sure We Kiss Goodbye" is a song written and recorded by American country music artist Vince Gill.  It was released in January 2000 as the first single and title track from the album Let's Make Sure We Kiss Goodbye.  The song reached #20 on the Billboard Hot Country Singles & Tracks chart.

Chart performance

References

Songs about kissing
Songs about parting
2000 singles
2000 songs
Vince Gill songs
Songs written by Vince Gill
Song recordings produced by Tony Brown (record producer)
MCA Nashville Records singles